The Process of Self-Development is the third studio album by Candiria. It was released on August 3, 1999, on the short-lived MIA label, before the band moved to Century Media Records. Allmusic reviewer Heather Phares wrote that the album "pack[s] a punch and bring[s] the funk".

Track listing
 "Three Times Again" – 5:51
 "Onefortyeight" – 1:47
 "Pull" – 3:55
 "Method of Expression" – 3:55
 "Temple of Sickness" – 6:21
 "Mathematics" – 6:37
 "Work in Progress" – 6:58
 "Matter.Anti.Matter" – 5:33
 "Cleansing" – 3:38
 "Elevate in Madness" – 5:10
 "Down to the Last Element" – 5:47
 "The Process of Self-Development" – 8:27
 "Leaving the Atmosphere" – 4:21

Personnel 
 Carley Coma - vocals
 John Lamacchia - guitar, 10 string electric guitar, acoustic guitar
 Michael MacIvor - 5 string fretted and fretless bass
 Eric Matthews - guitar
 Kenneth Schalk - drums, percussion, rhodes keyboard, bubblewrap, didgeridoo

Additional musicians 
 Tim Byrnes - trumpet (track 2, 4, 6, 9, 11)
 Kevin Greenland - bagpipes (track 6)

References 

1999 albums
Candiria albums